Htay Aung is a former military officer and politician, who previously served as Minister of Hotels and Tourism in Myanmar. He was appointed in September 2012 by President Thein Sein, effectively receiving a promotion, as he had previously been a deputy minister at the ministry from March 2011 to September 2012. He received a MSc degree in Hotels and Tourism Management from George Washington University, US in 1991 and a PhD degree in Literal Arts from Mae Fah Luang University, Thailand in 2016.

References

External links
 Archive of Htay Aung Papers at the International Institute of Social History

Government ministers of Myanmar
Living people
Year of birth missing (living people)